Peddler's Village is a 42-acre countryside property in Bucks County, Pennsylvania that features 60+ retail shops and boutiques, full and quick-service restaurants, a 66-room hotel and an indoor family entertainment center. Open year-round, Peddler's Village is the third most-visited attraction in the Philadelphia region.

From April through December each year, Peddler's Village presents monthly weekend festivals as well as other events such as Murder Mystery Dinner Theater shows, food truck evenings, outdoor movie nights, and seasonal displays and special events. The destination, which is also used for weddings, holiday parties, reunions, retirement parties, picnics, and corporate meetings, draws two million visitors per year.

In addition to an indoor six-level climbing attraction, an arcade, a toddler area, and the Painted Pony Cafe, Giggleberry Fair features an antique Philadelphia Toboggan Company (PTC #59) carousel which was originally built in 1922.

The Village is located in Lahaska, Pennsylvania, near Doylestown and New Hope in the Philadelphia metropolitan area.

Yearly events include seasonal dining and entertainment, shopping, scarecrow competitions, food trucks, and a Village-wide lighting in November called Grand Illumination Celebration. The Peddler's Village Strawberry Festival has been held since May 1969, except 2020 when the COVID-19 pandemic caused that year's cancellation.

References

External links

 Official website

Shopping malls in Pennsylvania